The Sister Islands are two islands in Lake Michigan. They are located in the bay of Green Bay, in the town of Liberty Grove, Wisconsin. At one point the islands were connected, but higher water levels have eroded the size of the islands.

There are many species of birds that nest on the islands. In 1964 there were an estimated 1,350 to 1,650 breeding pairs of herring gulls on the islands. Both islands are owned and operated by the Wisconsin Department of Natural Resources, and they are protected as the Sister Islands State Natural Area

The shipwreck Meridian lies in the water south of the islands.

Climate

Diagram

Gallery

References

External links 
 Sister Islands, Web-Map of Door County, Wisconsin
 Sea Gulls Travel to Many Lands, Banding on Sister Islands Shows, Door County Advocate, Volume 70, Number 18, July 10, 1931, page 1

Islands of Door County, Wisconsin
Lake islands of Wisconsin
Islands of Lake Michigan in Wisconsin
State Natural Areas of Wisconsin